Betty G. Birney (born April 26, 1947) is an American author, screenwriter, and teacher. She is best known for the Humphrey children's book series.

Personal life 
Betty G. Birney was born in St. Louis, Missouri. She grew up and went to school in Affton, a suburb of St. Louis, and went to college at Webster College, now Webster University in Webster Groves. She spent much of her life as an English teacher. Today Birney lives in Los Angeles, California.

Career 
Birney wrote her first book, "Teddy Bear in the Woods" when she was only seven years old. As a professional writer she has written several books for Disney and has also worked at Disneyland. She has also written for video games, television, and movies, including the 2002 made-for-TV film Mary Christmas.

Bibliography

Humphrey series 
The Humphrey series, also known as According to Humphrey, follows the daily adventures of Humphrey, a hamster who is the class pet at an elementary school. Every week the teacher, Mrs. Brisbane, lets someone take Humphrey home. Humphrey is smarter than he looks and often helps people with their problems, though no one expects anything from him because he's a hamster. He can leave his cage whenever he wants because the lock doesn't lock, and nobody knows about this except for him. Every kid in Humphrey's class has a different nickname, such as Lower-Your-Voice A.J. or Speak-Up Sayeh. Humphrey also bonds with Aldo, a janitor who comes in to clean the room after school. He feels negatively about Mrs. Brisbane at first, but warms up to her later. In book 2 another class pet, a frog named Og, is introduced. In the book Summer According to Humphrey, Humphrey is brought to summer school. Starting in School Days According to Humphrey, a new school year begins, and with it comes a new batch of kids.

The first title in the series, The World According to Humphrey, was published on February 2, 2004. PW praised The World According to Humphrey, calling it a "breezy, well-crafted first novel, narrated by a hamster." The series has two spinoffs: Humphrey's Tiny Tales and Og the Frog. Birney announced on her website that a new Humphrey book will be released in 2024.

 The World According to Humphrey (2004)
 Friendship According to Humphrey (2005)
 Trouble According to Humphrey (2007)
 Surprises According to Humphrey (2008)
 Adventure According to Humphrey (2008)
 Summer According to Humphrey (2009)
 School Days According to Humphrey (2011)
 Mysteries According to Humphrey (2012)
 Winter According to Humphrey (2012)
 Secrets According to Humphrey (2014)
 Imagination According to Humphrey (2015)
 Spring According to Humphrey (2016)
 More Adventures According to Humphrey (2009)
 Humphrey's Big-Big-Big Book of Stories (2009)
 Holidays According to Humphrey (2010)
 Humphreys Book of Fun-Fun-Fun (2010)
 Humphrey's Great-Great-Great Book of Stories (2010)
 Humphrey's Ha-Ha-Ha Joke Book (2011)
 Humphrey's World of Pets (2011)
 Christmas According to Humphrey (2012)
 Humphrey's Book of Summer Fun (2013)
 Humphrey's Book of Christmas Fun (2013)
 Humphrey's Ho-Ho-Ho Book of Stories (2013)
 Humphrey's Mixed-Up Magic Trick (2016)

Humphrey's Tiny Tales 
 My Pet Show Panic! (aka Humphrey's Pet Show Panic) (2011)
 My Summer Fair Surprise! (2011)
 My Creepy-Crawly Camping Adventure (2011)
 My Great Big Birthday Bash! (2012)
 My Treasure Hunt Trouble! (2012)
 My Playful Puppy Problem! (2013)
 Really Wheely Racing Day (2013)
 My Mixed Up Magic Trick! (2016)
 Bumper Book of Humphrey's Tiny Tales (2014)
 Bumper Book of Humphrey's Tiny Tales 2 (2014)

Og the Frog 
 Life According to Og the Frog (2018)
 Exploring According to Og the Frog (2019)
 Wildlife According to Og the Frog (2020)

Picture Books 
 What's My Job (1992)
 Disney's the Little Mermaid (1992)
 Bambi's Snowy Day (1992)
 Disney's Beauty and the Beast (1993)
 Walt Disney's Winnie the Pooh and the Little Lost Bird (1993)
 Walt Disney's Sleeping Beauty (1993)
 Black Beauty (1994)
 Tyrannosaurus Tex (1994)
 Disney's Toy Story (1995)
 Pie's in the Oven (1996)

Other Books 
 The Seven Wonders of Sassafras Springs (2005)
 The Princess and the Peabodys (2007)
 Tales from Winnie-the-Pooh / My Treasure Hunt Trouble (with A.A. Milne) (2011) (omnibus)

Awards 
Birney has won an Emmy Award, three Humanitas Prizes, and a Writers Guild of America Award.

References 

1947 births
Living people
Children's writers
People from Missouri
People from Los Angeles
American screenwriters